The Lipis District is a district located in north-west of Pahang, Malaysia. The district covers an area of 5,198 km2. Lipis district is bordered by Cameron Highlands and Perak on the west, Jerantut on the east, Kelantan and Raub on the north and south, respectively. Lipis has 10 mukim or subdistricts, the largest being Ulu Jelai. The district capital is Kuala Lipis. During the British colonization, Kuala Lipis was made the state's capital city. Kuala Lipis was the administrative capital of Pahang for 57 years from 1898 until 27 August 1955, when Kuantan was picked as the new capital. Lipis was blessed with many types of minerals such as tin and gold, and products from the surrounding forests.

Sungai Relau, near Merapoh, is an alternative entry point (there are about 4 entry points) into Taman Negara, Malaysia's Premier National park and one of the three embarkation points to Gunung Tahan, the highest mountain in Peninsular Malaysia standing at 2,187 meters above sea level.

Demographics

Lipis is home to 74,581 people (as of 2010), with the Malay/Bumiputra formed  the majority (85.3%), the Chinese with 10.5%, the Indian with 4%, while the others 0.2%.

There are 400 speakers of Mintil, a language of the Mayah (Orang Asli) people, remaining in Lipis District.

Federal Parliament and State Assembly Seats

Lipis district representative in the Federal Parliament (Dewan Rakyat) 

List of Lipis district representatives in the State Legislative Assembly (Dewan Undangan Negeri) 

There is also another state seat, Jelai, which is governed by the Lipis District Council but is represented by the Cameron Highlands parliamentary constituency instead.

Subdistricts

Lipis District is divided into 10 mukims, which are:
 Batu Yon  (115,100 Ha)
 Budu (7,400 Ha)
 Cheka  (22,900 Ha)
 Gua (7,588 Ha)
 Hulu Jelai (213,500 Ha)
 Kechau  (68,600 Ha)
 Kuala Lipis (9,773 Ha) (Capital)
 Penjom  (17,200 Ha)
 Tanjong Besar  (13,300 Ha)
 Telang  (43,900 Ha)

Demographics
The following is based on Department of Statistics Malaysia 2010 census.

References

External links 

 Official website of Lipis District Council